Block Busters is a 1944 American comedy film directed by Wallace Fox and starring the East Side Kids.

Plot
After an afternoon of playing baseball, Muggs McGinnis and the East Side Kids gang arrive at the door of their clubhouse, where a man named Higgins, is removing their "East Side Club" sign. Higgins explains that the owner of the place plans to rent it to some "respectable" tenants. When Muggs learns that the new tenants are due to examine the place at noon the following day, he plans to frighten them away by picking a fight with Butch and the Five Pointers, a rival gang.

The next day, Glimpy and Pinky, scribble a challenge to the Five Pointers on the sidewalk. When Butch and his gang read the message, "The East Siders dare you to fight," they seek out their challengers. Meanwhile, Muggs and the gang see Higgins supervising the delivery of some window boxes that he ordered to replace the weather-beaten pots that are lining the street. Pretending to be helpful, the gang offers to dispose of the old pots, but instead, stack them against a nearby wall.

Soon, the prospective tenants, an elderly woman named Amelia Norton and her French-born grandson Jean arrive, and Higgins greets them. Just then, Butch and his gang show up and take the bait, hurling the empty pots at Muggs and his gang, while a shocked Amelia looks on. When Jean critiques Muggs's fighting style, Muggs begins to brawl with him. After they are both arrested, the judge tells Muggs that he will hold each one accountable for the other's behavior.

Later, Jean goes to the clubhouse to make sure that Muggs is staying out of trouble, and the gang teaches him some American games. Afterward, Jean invites the gang over for tea, and they meet snobby Irma Treadwell and her mother Virginia. When Muggs and Glimpy see a black sedan pick up Jean, who is dressed like Count Dracula, they decide to follow him. The car takes Jean to a costume party at a chic club, where Muggs wins 'best costume' for being dressed as a Bowery tough.

Meanwhile, Tobey Dunn, an ailing member of Muggs's baseball team, is told by his doctor that a stay in the country would cure him, but unfortunately, Tobey's family cannot afford the trip. Later, Danny (Jimmy Strand), sees his girlfriend Jinx dancing with Jean at a party, so the gang decides to crash it. When Glimpy tells Danny that he saw Jinx riding on the back of Jean's bicycle, Danny tries to fight with his rival, but Muggs intervenes.

The gang then goes to the field to play baseball, and Jean quickly learns the game. At the clubhouse, Amelia thanks the gang for allowing Jean to play with them. During the team's next game, Lippman, the team's sponsor, tells the gang that if they win, he will send them all to summer camp in the Catskill Mountains. With the bases loaded, Jean hits a home run and wins the game, and Tobey is awarded his much-needed trip to the country.

Cast

The East Side Kids
Leo Gorcey as Ethelbert 'Muggs' McGinnis
Huntz Hall as Glimpy
Gabriel Dell as Skinny (a.k.a. Pinky)
Jimmy Strand as Danny
Bill Chaney as Tobey

Additional cast
Billy Benedict as Butch
Fred Pressel as Jean
Roberta Smith as Jinx
Noah Beery as Judge
Harry Langdon as Higgins
Minerva Urecal as Amelia Rogiet
Jack Gilman as Batter
Kay Marvis as Irma Treadwell
Tom Herbert as Meyer
Bernard Gorcey as Lippman
Charles Murray Jr. as Umpire
The Ashburns as Themselves (uncredited)
Jimmie Noone as himself (uncredited)
Robert F. Hill as Doctor (uncredited)

Production
This was one of the few East Side Kids movies in which Gabriel Dell plays a member of the gang, and where Billy Benedict plays a different character. It is Bill Chaney's only film as an East Side Kid and the last film released in Harry Langdon's lifetime.

It features performances by Jimmie Noone and His Orchestra and The Ashburns, and Leo Gorcey's wife, Kay Marvis, has a supporting role as Irma Treadwell. In addition, his father, Bernard Gorcey has a role as the gang's baseball team sponsor, Lippman.

See also
List of American films of 1944

References

External links 

1944 films
1944 comedy films
1940s English-language films
American black-and-white films
Monogram Pictures films
Films produced by Sam Katzman
American comedy films
East Side Kids
Films directed by Wallace Fox
1940s American films